Thomas Burton Hanly (June 9, 1812 – June 9, 1880) was an Arkansas lawyer and politician who served in the Congress of the Confederate States during the American Civil War.
Hanly was born in Lexington, Kentucky. He went to Transylvania University in Lexington, Kentucky to study law and graduated in 1834. He later moved to Helena, Arkansas to practice law. Hanly served in the Arkansas House of Representatives and the Arkansas State Senate. He also served as a state court judge and on the Arkansas Supreme Court. He was elected to represent Arkansas in the First Confederate Congress and the Second Confederate Congress. Hanly died in Helena, Arkansas.

References

External links

Thomas Burton Hanly at The Political Graveyard

1812 births
1880 deaths
19th-century American politicians
Arkansas lawyers
Democratic Party Arkansas state senators
Democratic Party members of the Arkansas House of Representatives
Justices of the Arkansas Supreme Court
Arkansas state court judges
Burials in Arkansas
Members of the Confederate House of Representatives from Arkansas
People from Helena, Arkansas
Politicians from Lexington, Kentucky
Transylvania University alumni
19th-century American lawyers